Montreuil-sur-Blaise (literally Montreuil on Blaise) is a commune in the Haute-Marne department in north-eastern France.

Geography
The river Blaise flows through the commune.

See also
Communes of the Haute-Marne department

References

Montreuilsurblaise